BWAA may refer to:
 Baseball Writers' Association of America (BBWAA)
 Bowling Writers Association of America 
 Boxing Writers Association of America 
 British Wheelchair Athletics Association